Ardchyle is a small hamlet in Stirling, Scotland. The Glendhu viaduct, just south of Ardchyle, was built for the now disused section of the Callander and Oban Railway which closed in 1965 after a landslide.

External links

Canmore - Mill, Ardchyle, Glen Dochart site record

Hamlets in Stirling (council area)